Barrclashcame is a 772 m (2,533 ft)  mountain in County Mayo, Ireland.

Geography 
The mountain is in the townland of Clashcame and is the highest peak of the Sheeffry Hills.

A short distance to the northwest is the peak called Barrclashcame Northwest or Storikeennageer (580 m) and to the northeast is the peak of Tievummera (762 m). The mountain overlooks Doo Lough, Glencullin and Glenummera (to the south and west), which separate it from Mweelrea and Ben Gorm.

See also 

Lists of mountains in Ireland
List of mountains of the British Isles by height
List of P600 mountains in the British Isles
List of Marilyns in the British Isles
List of Hewitt mountains in England, Wales and Ireland

References

Hewitts of Ireland
Marilyns of Ireland
Mountains and hills of County Mayo
Mountains under 1000 metres